Lutsen is an unincorporated community and census-designated place (CDP) in Lutsen Township, Cook County, Minnesota, United States. As of the 2020 census, its population was 220.

Lutsen is located within the Superior National Forest, on the North Shore of Lake Superior. It is 18 miles southwest of the city of Grand Marais; and 65 miles northeast of the city of Two Harbors. Cascade River State Park and the Superior Hiking Trail are both nearby.

Minnesota Highway 61 serves as a main route in the community.

Economy
The Lutsen Mountains Ski Resort is the main economic feature of the community; and is known country-wide as being one of the northernmost ski resorts in the 48 contiguous states.  The community is also home to at least four resorts.

Demographics

Education
All of the county is zoned to Cook County ISD 166.

References

Census-designated places in Cook County, Minnesota
Census-designated places in Minnesota
Minnesota populated places on Lake Superior